Pashons, also known as Pachon (Pakhṓn) and Bachans (Bashans), is the ninth month of the ancient Egyptian and Coptic calendars. It lasts between May 9 and June 7 of the Gregorian calendar. The month of Pashons is also the first month of the Season of Shemu (Harvest) in Ancient Egypt, when the Egyptians harvest their crops throughout the land.

Name
The name of the month of Pashons comes from Khonsu, a deity of the moon or of the Theban trinity and the son of Amun-Ra and Mut.

Coptic Synaxarium of the month of Pashons

References

Citations

Bibliography
 Synaxarium of the month of Bashans

Months of the Coptic calendar
Egyptian calendar
Khonsu